Prophet is a Christian novel by Frank E. Peretti published in 1992. It tells the story about how the media covers the abortion issue.

Plot introduction

The main character in "Prophet" is John Barrett, a television news anchor. Upon his anti-abortion father's accidental death, he is encouraged to investigate and report on problems at an abortion clinic. This only comes about after John catches his producer attempting to fabricate a story. Soon his colleagues are begging to stop him from finding out more, and he begins to hear mysterious and scary "voices". As John Barrett goes through the abortion investigation with Leslie Albright, he soon finds God and Truth, along the way.

Characters
John Barrett- Main character of the book and a local news anchor.
Carl Barrett- Estranged son of John, Carl returns to learn more about his father

External links
 Entry in FrankPeretti.com

1992 American novels
American Christian novels
Novels about abortion
Novels by Frank E. Peretti